Duan Xuefu (July 29, 1914 – February 6, 2005) was a Chinese mathematician, who was a member of the Chinese Academy of Sciences.

References 

1914 births
2005 deaths
Members of the Chinese Academy of Sciences